Edin Ajdinović (born 7 June 2001) is a Serbian football central midfielder who plays for Voždovac.

References

External links
 
 
 
 

2001 births
Living people
Association football midfielders
Serbian footballers
Serbian SuperLiga players
FK Voždovac players
People from Belgrade
Serbia under-21 international footballers